Mrs. Thomas Gage is a 1771 oil painting on canvas by John Singleton Copley.

The portrait depicts Margaret Kemble Gage, the American-born wife of the British General Thomas Gage, commander-in-chief of the British forces in North America. It was executed in New York during a six-month stay there by Bostonian Copley.

References

1771 paintings
Paintings by John Singleton Copley
Paintings in the collection of the Timken Museum of Art
Paintings of people